Following are the results of the 1949 Soviet First League football championship. FC Spartak Tbilisi winning the championship.

Qualifying stage

Central Zone

Notes: 
 DO Riga was called Dinamo Riga

Russian SFSR Zone 1

Notes:
 Metrostroi was called Metro Moskva
 SKIF is an abbreviation for Sports Club of Physical Culture Institute (Sportivnyi Klub Instituta Fizkultury)
 VVS is the club of Stalin's son Vasily Stalin.

Russian SFSR Zone 2 (Ural and Siberia)

Notes:
 UralMash was called Avangard Sverdlovsk
 Bolshevik was called Krylia Sovetov Omsk
 Shakhtyor was called Gornyak Kemerovo

Russian SFSR Zone 3

Notes:
 Izhevskiy Zavod was called Zenit Izhevsk

Russian SFSR Zone 4

Notes:
 Kovrov city team was called Zenit Kovrov

Ukrainian Zone
Despite promotion of Shakhtar Stalino and Lokomotyv Kharkiv, the Ukrainian zone was expanded further from 16 to 18 teams. Also the Ukrainian zone was left without Dinamo Kishenev that was relocated to the Central zone. There were no promotions from the 1948 Football Championship of the Ukrainian SSR, instead to the zone were admitted following teams: Spartak Kyiv, Torpedo Kharkiv, Dynamo Chernivtsi, Trudovye Rezervy Voroshylovhrad and DO Lviv. Dynamo Chernivtsi was the only team from the 1948 Ukrainian championship placing 8th out 9 teams in group 10.

Notes:
 Metallurg was called Stal Dnepropetrovsk

Final stage

Additional final playoff

Number of teams by republics

See also
 1949 Soviet First Group
 1949 Soviet Cup

References

External links
 1949 at rsssf.com
 Чемпионат СССР D2. footballfacts.ru

1949
2
Soviet
Soviet